The Bolaños River is a river in Mexico flowing through the Sierra Madre Occidental, and a tributary of Rio Grande de Santiago. It has a length of 360 km and a watershed of about 10 000 square kilometers.

Geography
The river's origin is in the state of Zacatecas, about 60 km west of the city of Fresnillo, about 40 km south of Tropic of Cancer. It flows south between the Sierra los Huicholes on the west and the Sierra de Morones on the east. It enters the state of Jalisco some 85 km later, eventually draining into the Lerma Santiago River, approximately 40 km northwest of the city of Tequila. The last 32 km of the river form the boundary between the states of Jalisco and Nayarit.

The principal municipalities transversed by the Bolaños River include:
 in Zacatecas: San Mateo and Valparaiso;
 in Jalisco: Mezquitic, Villa Guerrero, Bolaños, Chimaltitán and San Martín de Bolaños.

See also
List of rivers of Mexico

References
Atlas of Mexico, 1975 (https://legacy.lib.utexas.edu/maps/atlas_mexico/river_basins.jpg).
The Prentice Hall American World Atlas, 1984.
Rand McNally, The New International Atlas, 1993.

Rivers of Zacatecas
Rivers of Jalisco
Rivers of Nayarit
Rivers of the Sierra Madre Occidental
Río Grande de Santiago